The 15th Street–Prospect Park station is a local station on the IND Culver Line of the New York City Subway. Located at 15th Street east of Prospect Park West in the Windsor Terrace and Park Slope neighborhoods in Brooklyn, it is served by the F and G trains at all times.

This underground station, opened on October 7, 1933, has two tracks and one island platform. The Culver Line's express tracks run via a separate routing underneath  Prospect Park and are not visible from the platforms. This station was added to the U.S. National Register of Historic Places in 2005.

History 
One of the goals of Mayor John Hylan's Independent Subway System (IND), proposed in the 1920s, was a line to Coney Island, reached by a recapture of the BMT Culver Line. As originally designed, service to and from Manhattan would have been exclusively provided by Culver express trains, while all local service would have fed into the IND Crosstown Line. The line was extended from Bergen Street to Church Avenue on October 7, 1933, including the 15th Street–Prospect Park station.

Upon the station's completion, it served Windsor Terrace, a mostly residential area with brownstones and row houses occupied by European immigrants. It was also directly adjacent to Prospect Park and close to Green-Wood Cemetery. This station was added to the National Register of Historic Places on July 27, 2005.

Service patterns 
The station was originally served by the A train. In 1936, the A was rerouted to the IND Fulton Street Line and was replaced by E trains from the Queens Boulevard Line. Following the completion of the Culver Ramp in 1954,  Concourse Express trains replaced F service to Coney Island. In November 1967, the Chrystie Street Connection opened and D trains were rerouted via the Manhattan Bridge and the BMT Brighton Line to Coney Island. F trains were extended once again via the Culver Line.

The station acted as a local-only station from 1968 to 1976, when F trains ran express in both directions between Bergen Street and Church Avenue during rush hours. G trains were extended from Smith–Ninth Streets to Church Avenue to provide local service. Express service between Bergen and Church ended in 1976 due to budgetary concerns and passenger complaints, and the GG, later renamed the G, was again terminated at the Smith–Ninth Streets station.

In July 2009, the G was extended from its long-time terminus at Smith–Ninth Streets to a more efficient terminus at Church Avenue to accommodate the rehabilitation of the Culver Viaduct. The G extension was made permanent in July 2012. In July 2019, the MTA revealed plans to restore express service on the Culver Line between Jay Street and Church Avenue. Express service started on September 16, 2019.

Station layout

This underground station has two tracks and an island platform. The two express tracks of the line run along a more direct alignment under Prospect Park, and are not visible from this station. Therefore, the station is not located underneath a street. Some portions of the tunnel are directly underneath Prospect Park, while others are between Prospect Park West and 10th Avenue.

Both trackside walls have an orange-yellow trim line with a medium red-brown border with small black and white "15TH ST" tile captions below it at regular intervals. The tile band is set in a three-high course, a pattern usually reserved for express stations. The tile color was part of a color-coded tile system for the entire Independent Subway System. Ventilation grates are located along the trackside walls. A row of large, white tiled columns runs along either side of the platform and the mezzanine above at  intervals. Alternating columns carry the standard black-and-white station name plate. The ceiling of the platform level is held up by H-shaped piers located every , which support girders underneath the mezzanine. The roof girders are also connected to columns in the trackside walls.

The tunnel is covered by a "U"-shaped trough that contains utility pipes and wires. The outer walls of this trough are composed of columns, spaced approximately every  with concrete infill between them. There is a  gap between the tunnel wall and the trackside wall, which is made of -thick brick covered over by a tiled finish.

The narrow mezzanine is full-length, sparsely decorated with plain tiling typical of the IND, and allows out-of-system walking from one end to the other. Six staircases lead from the platform to the mezzanine. The area inside the fare control area is split into two sections, one considerably smaller than the other.

Exits
There are six entrances to the station in total. The northern end has four exit stairs. Two of them are reached only by a long passageway extending west; one stair goes to the northwest corner of Bartel-Pritchard Square while another goes to the east side of Prospect Park West between 15th Street and Bartel-Pritchard Square. The other two staircases go to the northern and southern sides of Prospect Park Southwest, east of Bartel-Pritchard Square. The eastern staircase on Prospect Park West, as well as the northern staircase on Prospect Park South, are located within the boundaries of Prospect Park and contain stone banisters. The other staircases contain metal banisters, typical of other New York City Subway stations.  Communications rooms are also located near the Prospect Park West staircase.

The center of the mezzanine has one staircase going up to the north side of 16th Street while the south end has one staircase going up to the north side of Windsor Place near the intersection of Howard Place. Both stairs contain typical metal banisters. Full height turnstiles provide access to and from the fare control areas near these entrances. The station's only token booth and bank of regular turnstiles is located between the south and center fare control areas, and there are additional communications rooms on the southern end of the mezzanine. Evidence of at least two former booths exist.

In popular culture 
Several dream sequences in the film Pi, which take place in an empty generic-looking New York City Subway station, were shot at 15th Street–Prospect Park.

References

External links 

 
 Station Reporter — F Train
 The Subway Nut — 15th Street–Prospect Park Pictures 
 Bartel Prichard Square entrance from Google Maps Street View
 16th Street entrance from Google Maps Street View
 Windsor Place entrance from Google Maps Street View
 Platform from Google Maps Street View

1933 establishments in New York City
IND Culver Line stations
National Register of Historic Places in Brooklyn
New York City Subway stations in Brooklyn
Park Slope
Prospect Park (Brooklyn)
Railway and subway stations on the National Register of Historic Places in New York City
Railway stations in the United States opened in 1933